Jablan is a settlement in the Municipality of Mirna Peč in the historical Lower Carniola region of southeastern Slovenia. The municipality is now included in the Southeast Slovenia Statistical Region.

References

External links
Jablan on Geopedia

Populated places in the Municipality of Mirna Peč